Tom Rosenstiel is an American author, journalist, press critic, researcher and academic. He is the Eleanor Merrill Visiting Professor on the Future of Journalism at the Philip Merrill College of Journalism at the University of Maryland. He was for the previous nine years the executive director of the American Press Institute. He is also a non-resident senior fellow at the Brookings Institution. Rosenstiel was founder and for 16 years director of the Project for Excellence in Journalism (PEJ), a research organization that studies the news media and is part of the Pew Research Center in Washington, D.C. His first novel, Shining City, was published by Ecco of HarperCollins in February 2017 and his second, "The Good Lie," in 2019.

A journalist for more than 30 years, Rosenstiel worked as a media critic for the Los Angeles Times and chief congressional correspondent for Newsweek magazine and as co-founder and vice chairman of the Committee of Concerned Journalists. Among his seven books of non-fiction, he is the co-author of The Elements of Journalism: What Newspeople Should Know and the Public Should Expect. Rosenstiel appears often on radio, television and in print, and has written widely on politics and media.

Career 
A graduate of Oberlin College and the Columbia School of Journalism, Rosenstiel began his career as a reporter for muckraking political columnist Jack Anderson. He worked at the Peninsula Times Tribune, his hometown paper in Palo Alto, CA, as a business reporter and business editor from 1980 to 1983. He then spent 12 years at the Los Angeles Times, most of those as a media critic and Washington correspondent. He left the Times in 1995 to join Newsweek Magazine, where he served as chief congressional correspondent and covered the Gingrich revolution.

In 1997, he founded the Project for Excellence in Journalism, an institute that studies the press performance. PEJ is non-partisan, non-ideological, and non-political.

From 1997 to 2006, PEJ was affiliated with Columbia University Graduate School of Journalism Columbia University. In 2006 PEJ separated from Columbia and became part of Pew Research Center, funded by the Pew Charitable Trusts, a private organization. PEJ, among other studies, produces the annual State of the News Media Report that takes stock of the news industry, the weekly News Coverage Index that monitors the coverage of the mainstream media and the weekly New Media Index that monitors social media and blogs.

Rosenstiel co-founded the Committee of Concerned Journalists, an organization of journalists around the world working in different media concerned about the future of public interest journalism. Rosenstiel directed CCJ's daily activities until 2006. During those years, Rosenstiel was co-author of CCJ's "Traveling Curriculum," a mid-career education program that trained more than 6,000 U.S. journalists. CCJ was later affiliated with the University of Missouri in Columbia, Missouri, where Rosenstiel also has served as adjunct professor of Journalism Studies. During the nearly nine years of his tenure, API was transformed into an important force in journalism reform and has a staff of fifteen and scores of consultants working with the group to carry on the work.

In January 2013, Rosenstiel became executive director of the American Press Institute, which was founded in 1946 to train newspaper professionals. In 2012, API was merged with the Newspaper Association of America Foundation and became affiliated with the association. When Rosenstiel arrived, API had one employee and its operations were all but shut down. Rosenstiel reimagined the institute from conducting seminars to being an applied think tank looking ahead at the challenges facing the news industry. API began to conduct original research in a collaboration with AP NORC called The Media Insight Project. The Institute created the Metrics For News product, which helped publishers convert their basic analytics into journalism analytics. In 2019, API assumed management of the "Table Stakes" change management program funded by the Knight-Lenfest Local News Transformation Fund, which takes newsrooms through extensive training in entrepreneurial management techniques. API also created a source auditing program called Source Matters.

In August 2021, Rosenstiel joined the faculty of the Philip Merrill College of Journalism at the University of Maryland as the Eleanor Merrill Visiting Professor on the Future of Journalism. He will remain involved with API's research and its change management work as an advisor.

Bibliography 

In 2001, Rosenstiel co-authored with Bill Kovach the book The Elements of Journalism, which identifies, explains and traces intellectual origins of the core principles of American journalism and their role in civil society. Updated in 2007, in 2013 and again in 2021, Elements has been called "one of five essential books on journalism (Roger Mudd, The Wall Street Journal), a "modern classic" (William Safire, The New York Times) and "the most important book on the relationship of journalism and democracy published in the last 50 years" (Roy Clark, Poynter Institute). Elements has been translated into more than two dozen languages and is the winner of the Goldsmith Book Prize from Harvard University, the Society of Professional Journalists Sigma Delta Chi Award for research in journalism and the Bart Richards Award for Media Criticism from Pennsylvania State University.

Among his other books on journalism are Blur: How to Know What's True in the Age of Information Overload (2011), also with Kovach, which offers a roadmap for how consumers can determine whether the news they encounter is reliable and an outline for how journalism must change to meet the changing needs of the 21st-century citizen; and The New Ethics of Journalism: Principles for the 21st Century, co-edited with Kelly McBride of the Poynter Institute (Sage, 2013).

In February 2017, he published his first novel, Shining City, about a Supreme Court nomination battle. His second novel The Good Lie was published in February 2019. Both books are part of a series featuring political fixers Peter Rena and Randi Brooks. His third novel with the same characters, entitled Oppo was published in December 2019, about the campaign for the presidency. His fourth novel, 'The Days To Come' is due in November 2021.

Novels

 Rosenstiel, Tom (2017) Shining City: A Novel (Ecco HarperCollins)
 Rosenstiel, Tom (2019) The Good Lie: A Novel (Ecco HarperCollins)
 Rosenstiel, Tom (2019) Oppo: A Novel (Ecco HarperCollins)
 Rosenstiel, Tom (2021) The Days To Come: A Novel (Ecco HarperCollins)

Books on journalism 

 Rosenstiel, Tom (1993). Strange Bedfellows: How TV and the Presidential Candidates Changes American Politics, 1992 (Hyperion Press)
 Rosenstiel, Tom and Bill Kovach (1999). Warp Speed: America in The Age of Mixed Media (Century Foundation).
 Rosenstiel, Tom and Bill Kovach (2001; 2nd edition 2007 3rd edition 2013, 4th edition 2021). Elements of Journalism: What Newspeople Should Know and the Public Should Expect (Crown Publishing).
 Rosenstiel, Tom and Amy S. Mitchell, editors (2003). Thinking Clearly: Cases in Journalistic Decision Making (Columbia University Press).
 Rosenstiel, Tom and Marion Just, Todd Belt, Atiba Pertilla, Walter Dean and Dante Chinni (2007), We Interrupt This Newscast: How to Improve Local TV and Win Ratings, Too (Cambridge University Press)
 Rosenstiel, Tom and Bill Kovach (2011), Blur: How to Know What's True in the Age of Information Overload (Bloomsbury).  
 Rosenstiel, Tom and Kelly McBride, editors (2013), The New Ethics of Journalism: Principles for the 21st Century (Sage)

Blur
In Blur, Rosenstiel and Kovach break down journalism and the media into four types:
Journalism of Verification: traditional model that puts the highest value on accuracy and context
Journalism of Assertion: often to be found in digital journalism, puts the highest value on immediacy and volume without extensive critical checking
Journalism of Affirmation: often to be found in political media, builds loyalty less on verification than on affirming existing beliefs of its audiences by choosing information that serves a purpose and is thus closely related to marketing
Interest-Group Journalism: designed to look like news but to be found in targeted Web sites or other pieces of work that are usually funded by advocacy groups rather than media institutions, can range from marketing to advocacy journalism.

In all but case 1, journalistic objectivity is usually violated. Verified information in the media is diluted by competing information, making identification and selection of the 'relevant' an ever more time-consuming process.

References

External links 
 Project for Excellence in Journalism

American male journalists
Oberlin College alumni
University of Missouri faculty
Writers from Columbia, Missouri
Living people
Year of birth missing (living people)